Al Fagaly (January 5, 1909 – April 23, 1963) was an American cartoonist and creator of Archie Comics' Super Duck and the syndicated gag cartoon There Oughta Be a Law!.

Biography
Born in Waynesburg, Kentucky, Fagaly later moved to Oregon before settling in Vancouver, Washington. He was a neighbor of Basil Wolverton.

After serving in the United States Marine Corps, Fagaly returned to Vancouver in the mid-1930s and founded Columbia Photoengraving in order to get the local newspaper, The Columbian, to publish his cartoons. He offered to supply the newspaper engraving plates for free if the newspaper would pay him for the cartoons. Since the cost of photoengraving was much more than the going rate for artwork, the newspaper agreed, and Mr. Fagaly became the staff cartoonist for The Columbian. In 1935, he created a comic strip, Skip Logan, for the Thompson Service in Cincinnati, Ohio.

In 1943 Fagaly was a staff artist at MLJ Comics (now Archie Comics) when he created the Superman parody Super Duck. He went on to be the lead artist on Super Duck Comics, which debuted in 1944; Fagaly was a main contributor to the title at least through the early 1950s. Fagaly was also the main contributor to Fauntleroy Comics, a spin-off from Super Duck that published three annual issues from 1950 to 1952.

In 1944, while he was living in Nantucket, Massachusetts, Fagaly and MLJ managing editor Harry Shorten co-created the daily gag cartoon There Oughta Be a Law! (modeled after Jimmy Hatlo's They'll Do It Every Time) and syndicated by McClure Newspaper Syndicate). Shorten supplied the stories and Fagely the art, until his death in 1963. There Oughta be a Law! ran from 1944 to 1984, and was later produced by Frank Borth, Warren Whipple, and Mort Gerberg.

References

External links
 

1909 births
1962 deaths
American comic strip cartoonists
People from Lincoln County, Kentucky
People from Vancouver, Washington
Artists from Washington (state)
United States Marines